Ladislau "Laci" Vlad (25 March 1930 – 18 March 2013) was a Romanian professional footballer and manager of Hungarian ethnicity. He played for teams such as Metalul Baia Mare, CA Câmpulung Moldovenesc, CCA București, Progresul/Crișana Oradea and Crișul Oradea, after retirement, working as a manager for Mureșul Deva, Bihor Oradea, Corvinul Hunedoara or Jiul Petroșani, among others.

Ladislau Vlad played in 116 Divizia A matches and won the 1956 Cupa României with Progresul Oradea.

Honours

Player
Câmpulung Moldovenesc
Divizia B: 1951

CCA București
Cupa României: runner-up 1953

Progresul Oradea
Divizia B: 1955
Cupa României: 1956; runner-up 1955

Baia Mare
Cupa României: runner-up 1958–59

Manager
Bihor Oradea
Divizia B: 1970–71

Mureșul Deva
Divizia C: 1972–73

References

External links
Ladislau Vlad at labtof.ro
Ladislau Vlad at labtof.ro

1930 births
2013 deaths
Sportspeople from Oradea
Romanian footballers
Association football midfielders
Liga I players
Liga II players
CA Oradea players
CS Minaur Baia Mare (football) players
FC Steaua București players
FC Bihor Oradea players
Romanian football managers
Liga I managers
FC Bihor Oradea managers
CSM Deva managers
CS Corvinul Hunedoara managers
CSM Jiul Petroșani managers